Rojo was a Chilean series of reality television competition series that started in 2002 and continued with various formats until 2008, allowing new talents in music and dance a chance for exposure with the public. Rafael Araneda was the host from 2002 to 2007. The last season in 2008 was hosted by Martín Cárcamo. The series was broadcast on Televisión Nacional de Chile known as TVN. The series was produced by Jorge Soissa and Roberto Apud and directed by Eduardo Domínguez (executive director) and Mariana Krumm (general director). In 2018 the show continued for 2 seasons until 2019, conducted by Álvaro Escobar.

A feature film based on Rojo was released called Rojo le pelicula with great box office success. An offshoot of Rojo (meaning red) was broadcast in Paraguay called ed Rojo Paraguay  between 2004 and 2007 on "Channel 13 Paraguay".

Series / Winners

Discography 
Rojo series releases

Solo artists

Offshoots
Paraguayan "Channel 13" bought the concept from Chilean television and broadcast its own series called Rojo Paraguay for seasons 2004 to 2007.
It was also later revived by Paraguayan "Canal 4 Telefuturo" in 2012 as Rojo Paraguay 2012
Chilean television also negotiated franchise series in Mexico, Costa Rica, Ecuador and the United States
Upon the success of Rojos in Chile, María José Quintanilla presented a children's series with the same format entitled Rojito. Two series were broadcast in 2005 and 2007
Also Rafael Araneda hosted a series entitled Rojo VIP with contestants Miguel Piñera, Alejandro De Rosas, Juan Carlos Duque, Peter Rock, Pancho Puelma, Óscar Andrade, Catalina Telias, Cristóbal, Rodolfo Navech, Mónica De Calixto, Eduardo Valenzuela, Patricia Frías, Luis Dimas, Patricio Renán, Álvaro Scaramelli, Florcita Motuda, Irene Llano, Miguelo and Buddy Richard with Buddy Richard winning this special series.
In 2006, owing to the success and popularity of the program and its contestants, the feature film Rojo, le pelicula (Rojo, the film) was released with huge box office success. Taking part, amongst others were María José Quintanilla, Mon Laferte, Daniela Castillo, Mario Guerrero, María Jimena Pereyra, and singers and dancers like Yamna Lobos, Rodrigo Díaz, Nelson Mauricio Pacheco and Christian Ocaranza and others.
Rojo also became part of a pan-Latin American series in 2007 called Rojo Idol with a jury travelling to many countries to pick their best representatives. the final five from Chile were Ruben Álvarez, Licetty Alfaro, Francisca Silva, Daniela Ceballos and Rodrigo Tapia. The series was broadcast in 2007–2008.
Clan rojo was a program that selected dancers and singers from various series of Rojo encompassing names from Primera Generación (first generation) with 10 contestants, Segunda Generación (second generation) and Tercera Generación (third generation) all from 2002 and 2003 seasons. The number was reduced to Final 8 who competed in official Clan Rojo. In later years, as new series of Rojo ran, with new winning names replacing some of the existing Clan members and this continuously until 2008 when the series was discontinued.

References

Chilean reality television series